Dymond Creek is a tributary of the Susquehanna River in Luzerne County, Pennsylvania, in the United States. The creek is not designated as impaired and its drainage basin is a Coldwater Fishery and a Migratory Fishery. The surficial geology in its vicinity consists of Wisconsinan Till, Wisconsinan Outwash, Wisconsinan Ice-Contact Stratified Drift, alluvium, alluvial fan, and bedrock.

Course
Dymond Creek begins in a valley in Franklin Township. It flows east for a short distance before turning northeast and entering Exeter Township and the census-designated place of Upper Exeter. The creek then passes through a small lake and turns east for several tenths of a mile before turning northeast for several tenths of a mile. After that, it gradually turns east and then south-southeast. Several tenths of a mile further downstream, the creek turns east-northeast, leaves its valley, and crosses Pennsylvania Route 92. After a few tenths of a mile, it reaches its confluence with the Susquehanna River.

Hydrology, geography and geology

The surficial geology in the vicinity of Dymond Creek consists mainly of a till known as Wisconsinan Till, alluvium, Wisconsinan Ice-Contact Stratified Drift, and bedrock containing sandstone, conglomeratic sandstone, shale, and coal. However, Wisconsinan Outwash containing stratified sand and gravel occurs near the creek's mouth and there are a few patches of alluvial fan near the lower and middle reaches.

The entire length of Dymond Creek attains its designated uses and thus is not designated as an impaired waterbody.

Watershed and biology
The mouth of the creek is in the United States Geological Survey quadrangle of Ransom. However, its source is in the quadrangle of Center Moreland.

There are possible problem areas with regards to flooding on Dymond Creek. However, a feasibility study on mitigating this hazard is ranked as low-priority in the Bi-County Hazard Mitigation Plan created for Luzerne County and Lackawanna County.

The drainage basin of Dymond Creek is designated as a Coldwater Fishery and a Migratory Fishery. The designated use of the creek is aquatic life.

History
Dymond Creek was entered into the Geographic Names Information System on August 2, 1979. Its identifier in the Geographic Names Information System is 1198683.

See also
Sutton Creek (Susquehanna River), next tributary of the Susquehanna River going downriver 

List of rivers of Pennsylvania

References

Rivers of Luzerne County, Pennsylvania
Tributaries of the Susquehanna River
Rivers of Pennsylvania